Francis Barsan is a South Sudanese politician. As of 2011, he was the CES Minister of Culture, Information, Youth, Sports, Hotels and Tourism  of Central Equatoria.

References

South Sudanese politicians
Living people
Year of birth missing (living people)
People from Central Equatoria
Place of birth missing (living people)